Omranabad (also Romanized as ‘Omrānābād) is a village in Aslan Duz Rural District, Aslan Duz District, Parsabad County, Ardabil Province, Iran. At the 2006 census, its population was 758, in 122 families.

References 

Towns and villages in Parsabad County